Thomas Johnson House may refer to:

Thomas Johnson House (Plainfield, Ohio), listed on the National Register of Historic Places in Coshocton County, Ohio
Thomas Johnson House (McKinney, Texas), listed on the National Register of Historic Places in Collin County, Texas

See also
Thomas Johnson Polygonal Barn, Wellman, Iowa, listed on the National Register of Historic Places listings in Washington County, Iowa
Johnson House (disambiguation)